The 5th Mechanized Infantry Battalion, Jose Maria Cordova is a mechanized infantry battalion of the Colombian National Army under the command of the 2nd Brigade of the 1st Division. The unit is based on the outskirts of the city of Santa Marta at the Papare Military Base.

References 

Military units and formations of Colombia